James A. Laidlaw (20 November 1873–unknown) was a Scottish footballer who played in the Football League for Newcastle United and Woolwich Arsenal.

References

1873 births
Scottish footballers
English Football League players
Association football forwards
Burnley F.C. players
Leith Athletic F.C. players
Newcastle United F.C. players
Arsenal F.C. players
Year of death missing